I Married a Strange Person! is a 1997 American independent adult animated comedy film by Bill Plympton.

Plot
As the film begins, a brown bird in flight becomes infatuated with a blue bird, and they begin to mate in midair. After passing through a cloud they fall into a nosedive, eventually striking a satellite dish on top of a house belonging to Mr. Grant Boyer- Grant is then struck by a beam of mysterious energy. Soon afterword- and now married to a woman named Keri- a strange power begins to manifest itself in Grant which seems to wildly affect the state of reality, people and objects based on his whims, daydreams, and imagination. This frightens his wife Keri while they try to make love, and they both soon travel to her parents' house to have dinner while discussing this problem with her mother. Her parents express that they did approve of her Keri's marriage to Grant, and at dinner Grant's powers are inflicted upon Keri's mother and father through insects and musical instrumentation while Grant initiates a dance with his confused wife.

We are then introduced to a broadcasting company called Smilecorp, which is in desperate need of higher ratings. Lead by a power-hungry man named Larson P. Giles, he proceeds to demonstrate his militant cruelty upon his television show pitchmen through the use of his sadistic underling: Col. Ferguson. Back at Grant's home he witnesses his next-door neighbor Bud Sweeny cutting his lawn, and proceeds to assist the grass by anthropomorphizing it- the grass then attempts to eliminate Bud with his own mower, though he is saved by Grant who transforms the mower into a large, friendly caterpillar. While Grant stands perplexed by what he both did and witnessed, Bud runs into his house to call the popular Jackie Jason Variety Show and inform them of Grant's amazing powers. Meanwhile, Keri Boyer lies crying and wondering about her husband, though when Grant tries to comfort her about the lasting nature of their love Keri becomes overweight with wrinkles temporarily and to her great terror. After making up, they proceed to make love- though Keri grows increasingly frustrated with Grant's inability to control his wild powers, affecting her for the duration of the scene.

Grant later readies for an appearance on the Jackie Jason Show, sharing a dressing room with a once legendary yet now washed-up comic named Solly Jim; Grant confides to Solly that his wife Keri may leave him due to his bizarre condition and the commotion it has caused. Solly goes on first but does quite badly with his act; it is then shown that a boil-like bump on the back of Grant's neck is the source of his chaotic abilities. After saving Solly's act the comedian gives Grant his business card and address, offering his future services in gratitude for his aid, though as Grant walks onto the set an attendant covers his boil with a bandage which prevents his powers from being used. After struggling for a time, the bandage falls off causing an immense amount of power to manifest from Grant which partially destroys the studio. This event both boosts the Jackie Jason Show's ratings greatly as well as catching the attention of Smilecorp and its leader Larson P. Giles. Larson commands his Col. Ferguson to bring Grant Boyer back to him alive, much to the Colonel's detriment.

Back at home Grant's wife Keri has shut herself away from him to think her life through; it is at this moment that Col. Fergsuon arrives with Smilecorp tanks and infantry to capture him. Meanwhile, Larson has deduced through observation and x-rays of Grant that a strange beam of light- reflected by the bent satellite dish on top of his house and various other objects on his property- had created the boil on the back of his neck when the two birds struck it at the start of the film. Larson seeks to harness and control this power, though Grant manages to elude the Smilecorp captors with both his powers and with the help of the friendly caterpillar from earlier. Colonel Ferguson meanwhile deals with his failure and the new reptilian transformation that Grant enacted upon him to aid in his escape.

While Keri goes home to her parent's house with Col. Ferguson in pursuit, Grant seeks refuge at comedian Solly Jim's home to ask for help. However, Solly Jim betrays him and informs the Colonel of his location, though at her parent's house Keri hears of her husband's plight and tricks the Colonel into revealing to her Grant's location. His soldiers pursue her, but she manages to escape in pursuit of helping Grant. Back at Smilecorp, Solly demands that Larson P. Giles reward him for capturing Grant, but he ends up in a stand off between Larson, Ferguson, and Smiles (a Smilecorp TV mascot). Solly tricks them all and gains the upper hand, removing Grant's boil with the intention of implanting the brain fragment (a powerful extension of Grant's lobe) into his own neck to become the greatest comic alive. The boil seems to reject him, though, and splits him in half causing his death. Ferguson then takes the lobe for himself, implanting it into his neck to restore his human form and grant his body untold military power. The lobe soon rejects and kills him as well, though Keri Boyer tricks Larson disguised as a nurse and flees with both the boil and her husband.

Crashing out of a window with Grant in a wheelchair and under machinegun fire, Keri fashions a parachute in order to land safely below while confessing her true feelings to him. When the parachute is damaged, the friendly caterpillar (now a butterfly) saves them from falling while dropping them safely into a red convertible. After Grant and Keri defeat several more Smilecorp forces, Larson unleashes a massive and powerful new tank to finish them off. Once again, though, the butterfly comes to Grant's aid and drops a crazed soldier on top of the tank's turret- this causes the tank to destroy the Smilecorp building (which in turn topples onto the tank, destroying it) which allows Grant and Keri to escape.

Just when all seems well, Larson and Smiley end up landing (from the explosion at Smilecorp) in Grant's car demanding the lobe once again at gunpoint. The car proceeds to crash, but Larson and Smiley succeed in retrieving the lobe from Keri, installing into his neck. Larson's face then appears on every TV screen across the entire world, having gotten complete control of global communications. A complication arises though as Larson's head swells into a balloon, lifting both he and mascot Smiley high into the air- just as the two love birds from earlier fly by and pierce Larson's swollen head, causing him to explode violently. After that, a dog walks by and consumes the boil from the ground; this grants it the ability to create massive bones from the sky for its own enjoyment. Keri and Grant- now a rekindled Mr. and Mrs. Boyer- go home to make love once again; however Keri, in the end, begins to exhibit signs that she may have gained some powers from Grant after spending so much time with him.

Cast
 Charis Michelsen as Keri Boyer (voice) (as Charis Michaelson)
 Tom Larson as Grant Boyer (voice)
 Richard Spore as Larson P. Giles (voice)
 Chris Cooke as Col. Ferguson (voice)
 Ruth Ray as Keri's Mom (voice)
 J.B. Adams as Keri's Dad (voice)
 John Russo Jr. as Bud Sweeny (voice)
 Jennifer Senko as Smiley
 John Holderried as Jackie Jason
 Etta Valeska as Sex Video Model (voice)
 Bill Martone as Announcer

See also
 List of animated feature films
 Independent animation
 Arthouse animation

References

External links
 Plymptoons
 

1997 animated films
1997 films
American adult animated films
Films about shapeshifting
Lionsgate films
Lionsgate animated films
Films directed by Bill Plympton
American animated feature films
1990s American animated films
Annecy Cristal for a Feature Film winners